Zgornje Grušovje is a settlement south of Prihova in the Municipality of Oplotnica in eastern Slovenia. The area is part of the traditional region of Styria and is included in the Drava Statistical Region.

References

External links
Zgornje Grušovje on Geopedia

Populated places in the Municipality of Oplotnica